Sa'adatullah Khan II (? – 4 July 1744) a.k.a. Muhammad Sayyid was Nawab of Arcot, who was a younger son (heir apparent) of Safdar Ali Khan.

Life
After the assassination of Safdar Ali Khan in 1742, Murtaza Ali Khan claimed for himself the Nawabship of the Arcot (Carnatic), Chanda Sahib who was taken prisoner to Satara by Maratha leader Raghoji Bhonsle had managed to obtain his freedom after rigorous negotiations, also supported the claims of Murtaza Ali.

However, the British East India Company at Madras firmly supported Muhammad Sayyid and proclaimed him as the Nawab of Arcot. At the same time, Nizam ul Mulk Asaf Jah I came with a strong force and settled the claim in favor of Muhammad Sayyid. But as he was a minor, he placed Anwaruddin Khan as Regent, 28 March 1743. During this period, Richard Benyon, the Governor of Fort St. George obtained the Nawab's firman in 1743 granting the villages of Perambur, Sadiankuppam, Ernavore, Pudubakkam and Vepery.

However, Muhammad Sayyid, was as unfortunate as his father. He was murdered in July 1744 at Arcot.  So, with him, the first dynasty of the Nawabs of Arcot came to an end and as a result Anwaruddin Khan was confirmed in his position as Nawab by Nizam ul Mulk Asaf Jah I.

Expedition against the Maratha
Outraged by the Maratha occupation of the territories of the Nawab of the Carnatic, Asaf Jah I led an expedition to liberate the Carnatic he was joined by Sadatullah Khan II and Anwaruddin Khan together they recaptured Arcot and initiated the Siege of Trichinopoly (1743), which lasted five months and forced the Marathas led by Murari Rao Ghorpade to evacuate the Carnatic.

Titles held

See also
Nawabs of Arcot

References 

Nawabs of the Carnatic
1744 deaths
Year of birth unknown